Corey Baldwin (born 13 October 1998) is a Welsh rugby union player who plays for Scarlets as a winger/centre.

Baldwin made his senior debut in 2016 for Llandovery against Bedwas as a replacement. Just a month later, he made his debut for the Scarlets, scoring a try in the Anglo-Welsh Cup game against the Newport Gwent Dragons.

In 2017, Baldwin was named in the Wales U20 squad for the first time. Much like his Scarlets debut, Baldwin scored in his first game for the Wales U20s, which was a 65-34 victory over Scotland U20

On 2 March 2020, Baldwin joined Exeter Chiefs in the English Premiership Rugby competition from the 2020-21 season.

On 3 August 2021, Baldwin returned to his old region Scarlets in the United Rugby Championship ahead of the 2021-22 season.

References

External links 
Scarlets profile 

1998 births
Living people
English people of Welsh descent
English rugby union players
Welsh rugby union players
Rugby union players from Surrey
Scarlets players
Exeter Chiefs players
Rugby union centres
Rugby union wings